Mitchell House is a historic home located at Fair Hill, Cecil County, Maryland, United States. It is a -story side-hall, double-parlor plan granite house with frame additions, built originally about 1764.

Mitchell House was listed on the National Register of Historic Places in 1980.

References

External links
, including photo from 1999, Maryland Historical Trust

Houses on the National Register of Historic Places in Maryland
Houses in Cecil County, Maryland
Houses completed in 1764
1764 establishments in Maryland
National Register of Historic Places in Cecil County, Maryland